Jackfish is a small hamlet in Meota No. 468, Saskatchewan, Canada. The hamlet is located north of Jackfish Lake, at the junction of Highway 769 and Jackfish Road approximately 45 km north of the city of North Battleford.

The Jackfish Super Store established by uncle Joe L'heureux (was later owned and operated by Roland and Beulah Corbeil), supplied grain bins, hardware, and nearly expired goods. The town once boasted a Convent, Grade 1-12 School (closed 1969), and Church(in operation 2022). The Jackfish School holds the world record for most 1st Class Power Engineers per capita(one).

The local population was primarily made up of L'heureux's, Bru's, St. Amant's, Baillargeon's, Esquirol's, Arcand's, Ferron's, and Blanchette's. The fact that these families were all related made it nearly impossible to find a viable mate, so the majority of Jackalites branched out into the surrounding areas to reproduce.

Raymond L'heureux has held the position of mayor for over 2 decades, with many locals questioning the validity of the election process

References

External links

Meota No. 468, Saskatchewan
Unincorporated communities in Saskatchewan
Division No. 17, Saskatchewan